Amalodeta is a genus of moths in the subfamily Arctiinae.

Species
 Amalodeta electraula
 Amalodeta tineoides

References
Natural History Museum Lepidoptera generic names catalog

Lithosiini
Moth genera